Shigetaka Katsuhisa (born 4 September 1911, date of death unknown) was a Japanese water polo player. He competed in the men's tournament at the 1936 Summer Olympics.

References

External links
 

1911 births
Year of death missing
Japanese male water polo players
Olympic water polo players of Japan
Water polo players at the 1936 Summer Olympics
Place of birth missing
20th-century Japanese people